Ernie Leonard (1931 – 15, July 1994) was a New Zealand television presenter, wrestling commentator, and actor. He was well known to wrestling fans.

Background
Leonard was born in Marton, New Zealand in 1931. The son of an Anglican minister, he was of Ngāti Rangiwewehi and Rangitane descent.	
Along with Steve Rickard, he co-hosted and commented for the wrestling show, On the Mat. During his career, he worked with people such as producer Ngaire Fuata. In 1986, he recruited Whai Ngata to start up the Māori department on Television New Zealand.

Acting roles
In 1966 Leonard appeared in the film Don't Let It Get You, which was directed by John O'Shea. At the time, Leonard was employed as the public relations officer in Rotorua.

Leonard played the part of Charlie Rata, a core character in the ground-breaking TV series Pukemanu, which ran from 1971 to 1972.

Television
Leonard secured the position of head of the Maori Programmes Department for TVNZ during the mid-1980s. He was first person to hold that position.

Death
Leonard died at age 62 on 15 July 1994 following a short battle with cancer.

Filmography

References

1931 births
1994 deaths
New Zealand television presenters
People from Marton, New Zealand